The 1991–92 network television schedule for the four major English language commercial broadcast networks in the United States. The schedule covers primetime hours from September 1991 through August 1992. The schedule is followed by a list per network of returning series, new series, and series cancelled after the 1990–91 season. All times are Eastern and Pacific, with certain exceptions, such as Monday Night Football.

New series are highlighted in bold. Series ending their original runs are highlighted in italics.

Each of the 30 highest-rated shows is listed with its rank and rating as determined by Nielsen Media Research.

 Yellow indicates the programs in the top 10 for the season.
 Cyan indicates the programs in the top 20 for the season.
 Magenta indicates the programs in the top 30 for the season.

PBS is not included; member stations have local flexibility over most of their schedules and broadcast times for network shows may vary. From February 8 to 24, 1992, all of CBS' primetime programming was preempted in favor of coverage of the 1992 Winter Olympics in Albertville, and from July 25 to August 9, 1992, all of NBC's primetime programming was preempted in favor of coverage of the 1992 Summer Olympics in Barcelona.

Sunday

Monday

Tuesday

Wednesday 
 
Note: Melrose Place premiered on Fox on Wednesday July 8, 1992.

Thursday 

(*) Formerly known as Gabriel's Fire

Friday

Saturday 
{| class="wikitable" style="width:100%;margin-right:0;text-align:center"
|-
! colspan="2" style="background-color:#C0C0C0;text-align:center"| Network
! style="background-color:#C0C0C0;text-align:center"| 8:00 PM
! style="background-color:#C0C0C0;text-align:center"| 8:30 PM
! style="background-color:#C0C0C0;text-align:center"| 9:00 PM
! style="background-color:#C0C0C0;text-align:center"| 9:30 PM
! style="background-color:#C0C0C0;text-align:center"| 10:00 PM
! style="background-color:#C0C0C0;text-align:center"| 10:30 PM
|-
! rowspan="6" | ABC
! Fall
| Who's the Boss?
| Growing Pains| colspan="2" | The Young Riders| colspan="2" rowspan="6" | The Commish|-
! Winter
| Capitol Critters| Who's the Boss?| rowspan="2" | Perfect Strangers| rowspan="2" | Growing Pains|-
! Spring
| rowspan="2" | Who's the Boss?| Billy|-
! June
| rowspan="2" | Julie| Billy| Perfect Strangers|-
! Summer
| Billy| Perfect Strangers| On the Air|-
! July
| colspan="2" | MacGyver| colspan="2" | Human Target|-
! rowspan="4" | CBS
! Fall
| rowspan="4" colspan="4" | CBS Saturday Movie| colspan="2" | P.S. I Luv U|-
! Winter
| colspan="2" | Rescue 911|-
! Spring
| colspan="2" |The Boys of Twilight|-
! Follow-up
| colspan="2" | The Trials of Rosie O'Neill|-
! rowspan="5" | Fox
! Fall
| rowspan="5" | COPS| rowspan="5" | COPS| Totally Hidden Video| Best of the Worst| style="background:#abbfff;" rowspan="5" colspan="2" | Local Programming
|-
! November
| Charlie Hoover| Get a Life|-
! Winter
| colspan="2"|Beverly Hills, 90210|-
! Spring
| rowspan="2"|Code 3| Totally Hidden Video|-
! Summer
| Vinnie & Bobby|-
! rowspan="3" | NBC
! Fall
| bgcolor="#FF22FF" rowspan="3" | The Golden Girls (#30/13.1)(Tied with In the Heat of the Night)
| The Torkelsons| bgcolor="#FF22FF" rowspan="3" | Empty Nest (#22/14.3)(Tied with The Fresh Prince of Bel-Air)
| rowspan="3" | Nurses| colspan="2" rowspan="3" | Sisters|-
! Follow-up
| Walter & Emily|-
! Spring
| The Powers That Be|}

 By network 
 ABC 

Returning series20/20The ABC Sunday Night MovieAmerica's Funniest Home VideosAmerica's Funniest PeopleAnything But LoveBaby TalkCoachDinosaursDoogie Howser, M.D.Family MattersFull HouseGrowing PainsLife Goes OnMacGyverMonday Night FootballPerfect StrangersPrimetime LivePros and Cons (formerly known as Gabriel's Fire)RoseanneWho's the Boss?The Wonder YearsThe Young RidersNew seriesAmerican Detective *Arresting Behavior *Billy *Capitol Critters *Civil Wars *The CommishFBI: The Untold StoriesGood & EvilHome ImprovementHomefrontHuman Target *Jack's Place *Julie *On the Air *Room for Two *SibsStep by StepThe Young Indiana Jones Chronicles *

Not returning from 1990–91:China BeachCop RockDavis Rules (moved to CBS)Eddie DoddEqual JusticeFather Dowling MysteriesGoing PlacesHead of the ClassHi Honey, I'm Home!The Man in the FamilyMarried PeopleMy Life and TimesStatThirtysomethingTwin PeaksUnder Cover CBS 

Returning series48 Hours60 MinutesCBS Sunday MovieDavis Rules (moved from ABC)Designing WomenEvening ShadeJake and the FatmanKnots LandingMajor DadMurder, She WroteMurphy BrownNorthern ExposureRescue 911Top CopsThe Trials of Rosie O'NeillNew series2000 Malibu Road *Bodies of Evidence *The Boys of Twilight *Brooklyn BridgeThe Carol Burnett ShowFish Police *Freshman Dorm *Grapevine *Hearts Are Wild *Howie *The Human Factor *P.S. I Luv UPalace GuardPrincessesRavenThe Royal FamilyScorch *Street Stories with Ed Bradley *TeechTequila and Bonetti *

Not returning from 1990–91:The AntangonistsBagdad CaféBroken BadgesDallasDoctor DoctorE.A.R.T.H. ForceThe Family ManThe FlashGood SportsThe Hogan FamilyLennyOver My Dead BodyParadiseSons & DaughtersTrue DetectivesUncle BuckWIOUWiseguyYou Take the Kids Fox 

Returning seriesAmerica's Most WantedBeverly Hills, 90210Comic Strip LiveCOPSFOX Night at the MoviesGet a LifeIn Living ColorMarried... with ChildrenParker Lewis Can't LoseThe SimpsonsThe Sunday ComicsTotally Hidden VideoTrue ColorsNew seriesBest of the WorstBill & Ted's Excellent Adventures *Charlie Hoover *Code 3 *Down the Shore *Drexell's ClassHerman's HeadMelrose Place *Rachel Gunn, R.N. *RocSightingsStand By Your Man *The Ultimate Challenge *Vinnie & Bobby *

Not returning from 1990–91:Against the LawAmerican ChroniclesBabesDEAGood GriefHaywireTop of the Heap NBC 

Returning seriesBlossomCheersThe Cosby ShowDear JohnA Different WorldEmpty NestThe Fresh Prince of Bel-AirThe Golden GirlsIn the Heat of the NightL.A. LawLaw & OrderMatlockNBC Sunday Night MovieThe NBC Monday MovieNight CourtQuantum LeapSeinfeldSistersUnsolved MysteriesWingsNew seriesThe Adventures of Mark & BrianDateline NBC *Eerie, Indiana *The Fifth Corner *Flesh 'n' BloodHot Country Nights *I'll Fly AwayMan of the People *Mann & Machine *Nightmare Cafe *NursesPacific StationThe Powers That Be *Reasonable DoubtsThe TorkelsonsWalter & Emily *

Not returning from 1990–91:The 100 Lives of Black Jack SavageAmenAmerican DreamerDark ShadowsDown HomeThe Fanelli BoysFerris BuellerGrandHull HighHunterLifestoriesMidnight CallerParenthoodReal Life with Jane PauleyShannon's DealSunday BestWorking It Out''

Note: The * indicates that the program was introduced in midseason.

References 

United States primetime network television schedules
United States Network Television Schedule, 1991-92
United States Network Television Schedule, 1991-92